Aaru Sundarimaarude Katha (English: A Tale of Six Women), abbreviated as ASK, is a 2013 Malayalam thriller film directed by Rajesh K. Abraham. Umang Jain, Nadhiya, Zarina Wahab, Lena, Shamna Kasim and Lakshmi Rai are in the lead. The screenplay is by Rajesh K. Abraham and Senni Varghese. Sameer Haq handled the camera. Music by Deepak Dev and choreography by Imithiyas Aboobacker.

Plot
Aaru Sundarimarude Katha tells the story of six women whose destinies affect each other as they bond together for their respective families in the face of adversities which includes the murder of one among these.

Cast
 Nadhiya as Rose Moothedan
 Lena as Cyns Ria
 Lakshmi Rai as Fouzia Hassan
 Zarina Wahab as Chachi Moothedan
 Shamna Kasim as Meena Sreekumar
 Umang Jain as Anju Moothedan
 Narain as Sreekumar
 Prathap Pothen as Alex Paul
 Deepak Parambol as Lalu
 Govind Padmasoorya as Raja
 Arjun Nandhakumar as Jai

Reception
Rajeevan of Metromatinee.com commented that "Rajesh Abraham proves that he is a talent to recon with if he continues to make movies that feel similar to how the first half of Aaru Sundarimarude Katha unfolds. The characters are introduced in a very engaging manner and the movie proceeds at a brisk and intriguing pace though the latter half disappoints." Veeyen of Nowrunning.com rated the film 2/5 and said, "Aaru Sunadarimarude Katha did have some real excellent thriller potential, but it hopelessly loses itself working up just the bare-minimum requirements of a thriller. The result is that it feels generic..." Sudheer Shah of Indiaglitz.com rated the film 5.75/10 and stated, "The problem with the movie is an overambitious script which tries to  hold together too many subjects- ranging  from the new generation gadgets, social networking sites, infidelity perils and finally a murder mystery. But the debutante director has almost managed to keep things under control and uses the best of the techniques to make things work. His packaging is the sole thing that helps the movie to tide over many inconsequential sequences  discussing  disloyalty and moral lessons on the use of Internet."

First finger dance performance in a film
The film was recognized by the Limca Book of Records for featuring finger dance for the first time in cinema. The award is granted to the movie as part of 100 years celebration of Indian Cinema. About the concept director Rajesh K Abraham says, " Chatting as it happens is a dance of fingers hitting the keypads and so it was conceived as finger dance". For this film the unique theme was composed and performed by  Imithiyas Aboobacker an internationally acclaimed Choreographer and finger dancer.

References

2013 films
Indian thriller films
2013 thriller films
2013 directorial debut films
2010s Malayalam-language films